Saffronisation or saffronization is the right-wing policy approach that seeks to implement a Hindu nationalist agenda, for example onto school textbooks. Critics have used this political neologism to refer to the policies of Hindu nationalist governments in India that attempted to glorify Hindu contributions to Indian history while undermining other contributions.

Etymology
The word comes from the association of saffron colour with Hinduism.

Context of history textbook production in India 
Under British rule in India, India's history was largely defined by British historians. A dominant narrative among British writers in colonial-era textbooks was colonial rule as an improving, structuring force. Emphasis was placed on the role of British rule in "civilizing" India.

When India became independent in 1947, there was a push among the newly-autonomous Indian Parliament to produce textbooks which emphasized the harm of colonial rule, and showed the independent nation before British rule. Parliament established the National Council of Educational Research and Training (NCERT) in 1961 to fulfill the government's goal that all Indian citizens receive a unified Indian history education.

NCERT employed several prominent historians and historiographers to create a common syllabus of events to be covered in Indian history, with a focus on removing colonial narratives from history textbooks in India. The NCERT also aimed in its syllabus to approach Indian history from a secular perspective, angering many right-wing Hindu nationalists.

Textbook saffronisation in early 21st century
The Bharatiya Janata Party (BJP) has said that several Indian history textbooks had overt Marxist or Eurocentric political overtones. The BJP has had trouble changing the textbooks, because many states in which the BJP is not in power have blocked saffronisation efforts. The BJP, citing a rigid anti-Hindu agenda, restructured NCERT and the Indian Council of Historical Research (ICHR) to make textbooks conform to the BJP's Hindu nationalist platform. In states where the BJP had control of local government, textbooks were changed extensively to favor a Hindu nationalist narrative. These changes included the omission of caste-based exclusion and violence throughout Indian history, and the exclusion or minimization of contributions to Indian society made by Muslims. 

After a rival political party, the Indian National Congress, came into power, efforts were undertaken in 2004 to reverse the saffronisation of textbooks previously made by BJP.

When the Hindustan Times reviewed the issue of saffronisation of Indian text books in late 2014, it noted that right-wing efforts to change how textbooks recount history faced "some difficulty as it lacks credible historians to back its claims."  The medieval period in India is one such hotly-contested epoch among historians. Since there can be no true consensus about that era due to divided and deeply entrenched political motivations, history for that period is highly subjective and particularly vulnerable to the influence of the textbook writer's sympathies and outlook. "The choice of the textbook writer is more decisive than anything else," it was noted in a report in The Hindu. Critics have said that the changes to the textbooks have portrayed the medieval period as "a dark age of Islamic colonial rule which snuffed out the glories of the Hindu and Buddhist empires that preceded it". Another trap in the politicisation of history relates to contention over the state of Jammu and Kashmir.

By mid-2015, The Times of India reported that the National Council of Educational Research and Training, which is in charge of publishing textbooks, had participated in a meeting convened by the Ministry of Human Resource Development, and during that meeting, the issue of changing textbooks was discussed. An official from the ICHR complained that the theme of nationalism did not receive proper treatment in textbooks, setting the stage for possible textbook revisions.

The state government of Rajasthan reportedly spent Rs 37 crore to reprint 36 textbooks used for classes 1 to 8 for the 2016–2017 academic session that will be based on an agenda that would promote Indian culture by including historical figures, such as Maharaja Surajmal, Hem Chandra, and Guru Gobind Singh.  The text books that had been approved up to the 2012–13 academic session were rendered obsolete under the rewriting of history, and those books were auctioned off. In total, 5,66 crore new text books were ordered printed for an agenda that critics described was intent on supporting the saffronisation of textbooks. Rajasthan (primary and secondary) education minister Vasudev Devnani denied the charge of saffronisation, but educationists described his decision as the "Hinduisation of education" that occurs when right-wing forces come to power.

The state government of Karnataka has reportedly ordered new textbooks for the 2017–18 academic session in an effort that academicians and critics have described as a "blatant attempt to saffronise textbooks".

See also

 Communalism (South Asia)
 Saffron terror

References

Sources

Far-right politics in India
Political neologisms
Politics of India
Hindutva
Propaganda in India
Textbook controversies
Education controversies in India
Historiography of India